"Die Young" is a song by American rapper Roddy Ricch. The song was released on July 20, 2018, as the lead single from Ricch's second mixtape Feed Tha Streets II.

Music video
The official music video of the song was released on July 23, 2018, through Roddy Ricch's YouTube account. The music video was directed by JDFilms.

Personnel
Credits adapted from Tidal.
 London On Da Track – producer, writer
 Rex Kudo – producer, writer
 William Binderup – assistant mix engineer
 Dave Kutch – masterer
 Erik Madrid – mixer
 Rodrick Moore – writer

Charts

Certifications

References

2018 singles
2018 songs
Roddy Ricch songs
Songs written by London on da Track
Songs written by Roddy Ricch